Fairhope is an unincorporated community in Somerset County, Pennsylvania, United States.

History
Fairhope is a small railroad community located along the historic B&O Railroad.  It was platted in 1891.

In 1881, Pittsburgh entrepreneurs established the North Savage Firebrick Works of Welsh, Palmer & Maxwell just outside Fairhope. The company specializes in the manufacture of superior quality of red brick.

The B&O railroad line through Fairhope continues to operate; however, it has been absorbed in the CSX Transportation.

Filmography 
Fairhope was used as the village on the TV series "The X-Files". The episode is called Scary Monsters and is the 14th episode of the ninth season. The program was not actually filmed on location.

Geography
Fairhope is located at  (39.8399, -78.7915)

References

Unincorporated communities in Somerset County, Pennsylvania
Unincorporated communities in Pennsylvania